The 2000 SEC men's basketball tournament took place on March 9–12, 2000 at the Georgia Dome in Atlanta, Georgia.

The Arkansas Razorbacks won the tournament and received the SEC's automatic bid to the NCAA tournament by beating the Auburn Tigers on March 12, 2000.

Tournament notes 
The 2000 SEC Tournament marked the Arkansas Razorback men’s basketball team’s first ever tournament title since they won their sixth and final Southwest Conference men's basketball tournament title in 1991, when the Razorbacks competed in the Southwest Conference (Arkansas joined the SEC in 1992).

Bracket

Television

References

SEC men's basketball tournament
1999–2000 Southeastern Conference men's basketball season
March 2000 sports events in the United States
2000 in sports in Georgia (U.S. state)
2000 in Atlanta
College sports in Georgia (U.S. state)
Basketball in Georgia (U.S. state)